Au moment d'être à vous is francophone Canadian pop singer Isabelle Boulay's second live album, released in September 2002. It achieved a great success in Belgium (Wallonia), France and Switzerland, where it reached the top ten. It also stayed for 57 weeks on the French Albums Chart and was certified Platinum by the SNEP.

This album is composed of Boulay's songs from her previous studio albums, plus cover versions of songs by various French artists.  It is a live album recorded March 30–31, 2002 at the Palais des Congrès, Paris and April 4–5, 2002 at the Salle Wilfrid-Pelletier, Place des Arts, Montreal, where she was accompanied by the Montreal Symphony Orchestra.

There are two substantially different releases of this album; one, the French version, has 17 tracks, and was released in 2002; the second, Canadian, version has 13 tracks, and was released in 2003.

Track listing (French version)
 "Au moment d'être à vous" (Didier Golemanas, Daniel Seff) – 4:37 
 "Avec le temps" (Léo Ferré) – 5:17 
 "Monopolis" (Michel Berger, Luc Plamondon) – 4:30
 "Ma Fille" (Raymond Bernard, Eddy Marnay) – 4:36
 "Mieux qu'ici-bas" (Golemanas, Seff) – 4:13
 "Perce les nuages" (Paul Daraiche) - 4:13
 "Répondez-Moi" (Francis Cabrel)
 "C'était l'hiver" (Francis Cabrel) – 4:02
 "Je t'oublierai, je t'oublierai" (Riccardo Cocciante, Luc Plamondon) - 3:45
 "Parle-moi" (J. Kapler) - 3:51
 "Quelques Pleurs" (J. Kapler) - 3:52
 "Un Jour ou l'autre"
 "Non, je ne regrette rien" (Charles Dumont, Michel Vaucaire) – 3:25 
 "La Mamma" (Charles Aznavour, Robert Gall) – 5:37 
 "Et maintenant" (Gilbert Bécaud, Pierre Delanoë) – 4:24
 "Amsterdam" (a capella)
 "Sans toi" (bonus track)

Track listing (Canadian version)
 "Au moment d'être à vous" – 4:37
 "Le retour de Don Quichotte" – 5:48
 "Avec le temps" – 5:17
 "Pour un ami condamné" – 4:23
 "Monopolis" – 4:30
 "Brésil/Amor, Amor/Symphonie" – 4:37
 "Ma fille" – 4:36
 "Mieux qu'ici bas" – 4:13
 "C'était l'hiver" – 4:02
 "Non, je ne regrette rien" – 3:25
 "La Mamma" – 5:37
 "Et maintenant" – 4:24
 "Nos rivières" – 5:55

Personnel 

Eric Arbour – engineer
Karen Baskin – cello
Theodore Baskin – oboe
Jocelyne Bastien – alto sax
Jacques Beaudoin – contrabass
Pierre Beaudry – trombone
Marc Béliveau – violone
Denis Bluteau – flute
Chantale Boivin – alto sax
Jean Sébastien Boucher – recording assistant
James Box – trombone
Li Ke Chang – cello
Eric Chappell – contrabass
Marieandre Chevrette – violone
Carolyn Christie – flute
Janet Creaser – keyboard
Jonathan Crow – violone
Robert Crowley – clarinet
Denys Derome – assistant, horn
Alain Desgagné – clarinet
Serge Desgagnés – percussion
Russell Devuyst – trumpet
Bruce Dixon – bass
Pierre Djokic – cello
Marie Doré – violone
Marianne Dugal – violone
Sophie Dugas – violone
Victor Eichenwald – violone
Nicolò Eugelmi – alto sax
Scott Feltheim – contrabass
Jean-Pierre Fortin – alto sax
Xiao Hong Fu – violone
Mary Ann Fujino – violone
Jean Luc Ganon – trumpet
Claude Gassian – photography
Jean Gaudreault – horn
Luis Grinhauz – violone
Neal Gripp – alto sax
Olga Gross – clavier
Mathieu Harel – bassoon
Joan Herschorn – contrabass
Timothy Hutchins – flute
Sylvie Lambert – cello
Jason Lang – acoustic guitar
Reynald LArchevêque – violone
Jacques Lavallée – percussion, timbales
Daniel Lavoie – production assistant
Simon Leclerc – arranger, orchestration, musical direction
Vivian Lee – trombone
Isabelle Lessard – violone
Steve Levesque – bassoon
Caroline Lizotte – harp
Andrei Malashenko – timbales
David Marlowe – horn
John Milner – horn
Andre Moisan – clarinet, saxophone
Katherine Palyga – violone
Peter Parthun – cello
Myriam Pellerin – violone
Christian Péloquin – acoustic guitar
Monique Poitras – violone
Véronique Potvin – alto sax
David Quinn – sax
Natalie Racine – sax
François Rainville – engineer
Brian Robinson – contrabass
Andre Roy – alto sax
Michael Roy – percussion
Gary Russell – cello
Denis Savage – engineer, mixing
Claire Segal – violone
Rosemary Shaw – sax
Virginia Spicer – piccolo
Ben Stolow – sax
Eva Svensson – violone
Pierre Tessier – cello
Steven VanGulik – trumpet
Edouard Wingell – contrabass
Daniel Yakymyshyn – violone
Alexa Zirbel – oboe
John Zirbel – horn

Certifications

Charts

References

Isabelle Boulay albums
2002 live albums
V2 Records live albums